Seafield may refer to one of several places in Scotland:
 Seafield, Aberdeen, an area of Aberdeen
 Seafield, Ayr, a southern district of the Royal Burgh of Ayr in the South Ayrshire council region
 Seafield, Edinburgh, an area of north east Edinburgh
 Seafield, Inverness, an area in the city of Inverness in the Highland council region
 Seafield, Kirkcaldy, an area in the town of Kirkcaldy in the Fife council region
 Seafield, West Lothian, a small village in the West Lothian council region

Seafield may also refer to:
 Seafield Colliery, a former coal mine in Kirkcaldy, Fife, open from 1960 to 1988
 Seafield Convent, later named Sacred Heart Catholic College
 Seafield Park, a football park
 Seafield Park, Hampshire, a former military base in Hampshire
 Seafield Hospital, an NHS hospital in Buckie, Morayshire
 Seafield Tower, a ruined castle on the North Sea coast of Fife
 Earl of Seafield, a title in the Peerage of Scotland
 Seafield, County Clare, in the Republic of Ireland
 Seafield, Indiana, a community in the United States